Ai-tupuai is the goddess of healing in Tahitian mythology.

References 
 Robert D. Craig: Dictionary of Polynesian Mythology, 1989

Tahiti and Society Islands goddesses

Health goddesses